The Incoherence of the Incoherence ( Tahāfut al-Tahāfut) by Andalusian Muslim polymath and philosopher  Averroes (Arabic , ibn Rushd, 1126–1198) is an important Islamic philosophical treatise in which the author defends the use of Aristotelian philosophy within Islamic thought.

It was written in the style of a dialogue against al-Ghazali's claims in The Incoherence of the Philosophers (Tahāfut al-Falasifa), which criticized Neoplatonic thought.

Originally written in Arabic, The Incoherence of the Incoherence was subsequently translated into many other languages.  The book is considered Averroes' landmark; in it, he tries to create harmony between faith and philosophy.

Background

In The Incoherence of the Philosophers, the Sufi-sympathetic imam al-Ghazali ("Algazel") of the Ash'ari school of Islamic theology argued against Avicennism, denouncing philosophers such as Avicenna (ibn Sina) and al-Farabi (Alpharabius). The text was dramatically successful, and marked a milestone in the ascendance of the Ash'ari within philosophy and theological discourse. It was preceded by a summary of Neoplatonism titled Maqasid al-Falasifah ("Aims of the Philosophers").

Al-Ghazali stated that one must be well versed in the ideas of the philosophers before setting out to refute their ideas. Al-Ghazali also stated that he did not have any problem with other branches of philosophy such as physics, logic, astronomy or mathematics. His only axe to grind was with metaphysics, in which he claimed that the philosophers did not use the same tools, namely logic, which they used for other sciences.

Contents
Averroes' response defends the doctrines of the "philosophers" and criticizes al-Ghazali's own arguments.  It is written as a sort of dialogue: Averroes quotes passages by al-Ghazali and then responds to them.

Summary
Averroes attempted to create harmony between faith and philosophy, between Aristotelian ideas and Islam. He claimed that Aristotle is also right and the words of Quran are also the eternal truth.

Critical reception
In Europe, ibn Rushd's philosophical writings were generally well received by Christian and Jewish scholars and gave rise to the philosophical school of Averroism.

References

External links
 full text available — muslimphilosophy.com

Islamic philosophical texts
Works by Averroes